Mirela Rupic (born March 21, 1967) is an American costume and fashion designer. Her costume designing career took off after she was included in a minor TV series, which followed with her involvement in the movie Fight Club in 1999. She is also known for being the lead costume designer in the 2007 TV series Chuck.

Biography 
Rupic was born in Orange County, California. She studied fashion design at the Woodbury University in San Diego where she launched her first collection, presenting her personal style. By the age of 26, Rupic was already working as an assistant designer of Milena Canonero, on a dozen of projects.

Career 
Rupic ventured into the world of costume design for film and theater as an assistant designer of Milena Canonero. She came to fame through her work as an assistant costume designer on David Fincher's Fight Club. A turning point in her career came when William A. Elliott, the production designer with whom she had worked in Meet the Spartans, introduced her to the Australian film director and scriptwriter Alister Grierson. Rupic and Grierson worked together on several projects starting with Sanctum.

Throughout her career, she has collaborated with a number of colleagues, organizations and galleries. In 2016 she collaborated with RISD students from the costume and fashion design department, as part of an international fashion design workshop.

Work 
Rupic has been assistant or lead costume designer on over a dozen films and TV series to date.

References

External links 
 

1967 births
Woodbury University alumni
American costume designers
American fashion designers
American women fashion designers
Living people
21st-century American women